The 1922–23 season was the 24th season for FC Barcelona.

Events
Joan Gamper left the presidency on 29 June 1923; for a few months Enric Cardona would take over. This season saw the premiere of the team's first anthem.

Results

External links

webdelcule.com
webdelcule.com

References

FC Barcelona seasons
Barcelona